Enayetpur is a town in Sirajganj District, Rajshahi Division, Bangladesh.

Description
 
Enayetpur is famous for an Islamic saint named Shah Sufi Khwaja Yunus Ali Enayetpuri.

Hand loomed cloth is a specialty of this area. Sharee or Saris (female dress) and lungis (male dress) are the main items produced. Nearby villages include Betil, Khamargram, Gopalpur, Rupnai, Khukni, and Gopinathpur.

Hospital
1000-bed superspecialized Khwaja Yunus Ali Medical College and Hospital provides western standard health services to sirajganj district as well the western part of Bangladesh.

University
Khwaja Yunus Ali University provides higher education to sirajganj district as well the western part of Bangladesh.

Focus on astronomy
Enayetpur is the location of Enayetpur High School. The opening ceremonies of the International Year in Astronomy (2009) were held at this school in April 2009. Astronomy related events are held annually in Enayetpur.

References 
7. Khwaja Yunus Ali University (kyau.edu.bd)

Populated places in Rajshahi Division